Robert Lee Beck (December 30, 1936 – April 2, 2020) was an American modern pentathlete and fencer who won three gold medals in these disciplines at the Pan American Games in 1963–1971. He also won bronze medals in the individual and team modern pentathlon events at the 1960 Summer Olympics. He was less successful at the 1968 Games, placing 22nd individually and fourth with the American team.

Beck graduated from the University of Virginia and Harvard Medical School.  Beck was a practising dentist in San Antonio, Texas, during his professional career. He was hospitalized in February 2020, due to a head injury from a fall in front of his home. He died on April 2, 2020, at age 83, after contracting COVID-19.

As of the Tokio 2020 Olympics, he was the last athlete from the United States to win an individual medal in men's pentathlon.

See also
List of USFA Division I National Champions

References

External links
 

1936 births
2020 deaths
American male épée fencers
American male modern pentathletes
Deaths from the COVID-19 pandemic in Texas
Fencers at the 1968 Summer Olympics
Fencers at the 1971 Pan American Games
Harvard Crimson fencers
Medalists at the 1960 Summer Olympics
Medalists at the 1963 Pan American Games
Modern pentathletes at the 1960 Summer Olympics
Modern pentathletes at the 1963 Pan American Games
Modern pentathletes at the 1968 Summer Olympics
Olympic fencers of the United States
Olympic bronze medalists for the United States in modern pentathlon
Pan American Games medalists in modern pentathlon
Pan American Games gold medalists for the United States
Pan American Games medalists in fencing
Sportspeople from San Diego
University of Virginia alumni
Harvard Medical School alumni
Harvard School of Dental Medicine alumni